The 1943 Victorian state election was held on 12 June 1943.

Retiring Members

Labor
Ernie Bond MLA (Port Fairy and Glenelg)

United Australia
Harry White MLA (Bulla and Dalhousie)

Legislative Assembly
Sitting members are shown in bold text. Successful candidates are highlighted in the relevant colour. Where there is possible confusion, an asterisk (*) is also used.

See also
1943 Victorian Legislative Council election

References

Psephos - Adam Carr's Election Archive

Victoria
Candidates for Victorian state elections